Sensation is an extinct town in Scott County, in the U.S. state of Arkansas.

History
A post office was established at Sensation in 1916, and remained in operation until 1919. It is unknown why the name "Sensation" was applied to this community.

References

Geography of Scott County, Arkansas
Ghost towns in Arkansas